Roger Lebas (2 December 1904 – 10 October 1940) was a French racing cyclist. He rode in the 1928 Tour de France.

References

1904 births
1940 deaths
French male cyclists
Place of birth missing